The Peugeot 146 is an automotive model produced by Peugeot between 1913 and 1914.

History
The car, shown at a 1912 autoshow, carried a price of 13,000 francs.

During the First World War, the car was used as staff cars or ambulances. They were also used as fire-engines, because of their large chassis. A number of Peugeot 146s, along with Peugeot 148s and Peugeot 153s, were converted to armoured cars.

The Peugeot 146, including the variant 146S and colonial variant 146A, was produced in Lille. A total of 428 examples were produced.

References

Type 146
Cars introduced in 1913
1910s cars